Maria Manton (1910–2003) was a French painter.

Biography
Maria Manton was born on 4 December 1910 in Blida, Algeria. During the German occupation of Alsace in 1870, her maternal grandparents came to settle in the outskirts of the city.  A native of Tarbes, her father had a military career and for about ten years the family followed his travels before settling in Algiers.  At the end of her secondary studies, during which she was passionate about Egyptology, Maria Manton fell ill for more than a year, which forced her to give up starting higher education and she began to draw. She attended drawing classes and then the painting studio of the School of Fine Arts in Algiers from 1936 to 1942. There, in 1941 she met Louis Nallard, whom she married in 1944. She also met Marcel Bouqueton and Sauveur Galliéro, with whom she exhibited in 1942, and Robert Martin, who later directed the avant-garde gallery Colline in Oran, then the painter Georges Ladrey. In 1946 she made her first solo exhibition and participated in the  “Ecole de Paris” exhibition organized by Gaston Diehl.

Personal exhibitions
 1950 - Paris, Colette Allendy Gallery;  Amsterdam, Le Canard Gallery 
 1952 - Paris, Arnaud Gallery;  Antwerp, Kunst Kabinet Horemans 
 1953 - Lyon, gallery Grange;  Algiers, gallery Rivages (Edmond Charlot) 
 1954 - Paris, gallery Arnaud 
 1956 - Paris, gallery The Wheel 
 1957 - Paris, Arnaud Gallery;  Schiedam (Netherlands), CCC Gallery 
 1961 - Paris, gallery The Wheel 
 1962 - Lausanne, gallery of the Grand Chêne 
 1965 - Paris, gallery La Roue 
 1968 - Paris, workshop Le Bret 
 1969 - Budapest, Hungarian Center for Cultural Relations 
 1972 - Maillot-Sens, summer festival 
 1975 - Paris, Atelier Moissinac 
 1980 - Toulouse, gallery P.-J. Meurisse 
 1983 - Paris, Jacques Massol Gallery;  Toulouse, gallery Génélis 
 1985 - Paris, gallery Callu Mérite 
 1987 - Paris, gallery Callu Merit 
 1989 - Paris, Algerian Cultural Center (with Louis Nallard) 
 1990 - Paris, "Abstracts from 1948 to 1954", gallery Callu Merite;  Évreux, "40 Years of Painting", Maison des arts;  Paris, "Works on paper", gallery Debaigts;  Amsterdam, gallery M. de Boer (Maria Manton and Louis Nallard) 
 1992 - Paris, "46 years of painting, 1946-1992", gallery Callu Merit 
 2000 - Paris, gallery Nicolas Deman 
 2014 - Paris gallery Artemper (Maria Manton and Louis Nallard) 
 2015 - Paris, Buci Gallery (Maria Manton and Louis Nallard)

References

Content in this article is translated from the existing French Wikipedia article at :fr:Maria Manton

External links
Maria Manton on Artnet

1910 births
2003 deaths
Abstract painters
Art duos
School of Paris
French women painters
20th-century French women artists
French abstract artists
Migrants from French Algeria to France